{{DISPLAYTITLE:Uniform 1 k2 polytope}}
In geometry, 1k2 polytope is a uniform polytope in n-dimensions (n = k+4) constructed from the En Coxeter group. The family was named by their Coxeter symbol 1k2 by its bifurcating Coxeter-Dynkin diagram, with a single ring on the end of the 1-node sequence. It can be named by an extended Schläfli symbol {3,3k,2}.

Family members 
The family starts uniquely as 6-polytopes, but can be extended backwards to include the 5-demicube (demipenteract) in 5-dimensions, and the 4-simplex (5-cell) in 4-dimensions.

Each polytope is constructed from 1k-1,2 and (n-1)-demicube facets. Each has a vertex figure of a {31,n-2,2} polytope is a birectified n-simplex, t2{3n}.

The sequence ends with k=6 (n=10), as an infinite tessellation of 9-dimensional hyperbolic space.

The complete family of 1k2 polytope polytopes are:
 5-cell: 102, (5 tetrahedral cells)
 112 polytope, (16 5-cell, and 10 16-cell facets)
 122 polytope, (54 demipenteract facets)
 132 polytope, (56 122 and 126 demihexeract facets)
 142 polytope, (240 132 and 2160 demihepteract facets)
 152 honeycomb, tessellates Euclidean 8-space (∞ 142 and ∞ demiocteract facets)
 162 honeycomb, tessellates hyperbolic 9-space (∞ 152 and ∞ demienneract facets)

Elements

See also 
 k21 polytope family
 2k1 polytope family

References 
 Alicia Boole Stott Geometrical deduction of semiregular from regular polytopes and space fillings, Verhandelingen of the Koninklijke academy van Wetenschappen width unit Amsterdam, Eerste Sectie 11,1, Amsterdam, 1910
 Stott, A. B. "Geometrical Deduction of Semiregular from Regular Polytopes and Space Fillings." Verhandelingen der Koninklijke Akad. Wetenschappen Amsterdam 11, 3-24, 1910.
 Alicia Boole Stott, "Geometrical deduction of semiregular from regular polytopes and space fillings," Verhandelingen der Koninklijke Akademie van Wetenschappen te Amsterdam, (eerste sectie), Vol. 11, No. 1, pp. 1–24 plus 3 plates, 1910.
 Stott, A. B. 1910. "Geometrical Deduction of Semiregular from Regular Polytopes and Space Fillings." Verhandelingen der Koninklijke Akad. Wetenschappen Amsterdam
 Schoute, P. H., Analytical treatment of the polytopes regularly derived from the regular polytopes, Ver. der Koninklijke Akad. van Wetenschappen te Amsterdam (eerstie sectie), vol 11.5, 1913.
 H. S. M. Coxeter: Regular and Semi-Regular Polytopes, Part I, Mathematische Zeitschrift, Springer, Berlin, 1940
 N.W. Johnson: The Theory of Uniform Polytopes and Honeycombs, Ph.D. Dissertation, University of Toronto, 1966
 H.S.M. Coxeter: Regular and Semi-Regular Polytopes, Part II, Mathematische Zeitschrift, Springer, Berlin, 1985
 H.S.M. Coxeter: Regular and Semi-Regular Polytopes, Part III, Mathematische Zeitschrift, Springer, Berlin, 1988

External links 
 PolyGloss v0.05: Gosset figures (Gossetododecatope)

Multi-dimensional geometry
Polytopes